Tasman Motorsports Group is a former racing team that was owned by Steve Horne, a long-time motorsport figure who spent most of his career in the United States. Its lead driver is championship winning New Zealander, Daniel Gaunt.

Previously the team was an American-based open-wheel racing team that competed in the Indy Lights series and, most notably, the CART series from 1995 to 1998. Tasman was one of the first teams to successfully field a Honda powered entry. Honda had entered CART the prior year with Rahal-Hogan Racing, with very little success.

In the team's first and only Indianapolis 500 in 1995, Tasman driver Scott Goodyear led the race with 10 laps to go, but was subsequently black-flagged for passing the pace car while it was still on the track at the end of a caution period and relegated to 14th place. André Ribeiro captured the team's first win and Honda's first in CART later that season at the New Hampshire International Speedway.

The following season, Ribeiro won a pair of races and teammate Adrian Fernández won once. They finished eleventh and twelfth in points respectively. However, in 1997, the team's Lola chassis were clearly off the pace and Ribeiro switched to Reynards midway through the season.

The team pared back to a single car in 1998 and hired rookie Tony Kanaan — who captured the Indy Lights championship for Tasman the previous season  — to drive. Kanaan finished ninth in points with a best finish of third, winning the Jim Trueman Rookie of the Year award. However, the team lost its LCI sponsorship and 1998 would be its last season in the US.

Former CART drivers
 Adrian Fernández (1996–1997)
 Scott Goodyear (1995)
 Tony Kanaan (1998)
 André Ribeiro (1995–1997)

Racing results

CART FedEx Championship Series results 
(key) (results in bold indicate pole position) (results in italics indicate fastest lap)

External links
General Tasman statistics at CART World
Detailed Tasman statistics at ChampCarWorldSeries.com

Champ Car teams
Indy Lights teams
American auto racing teams
New Zealand auto racing teams